James Moncreiff, 1st Baron Moncreiff of Tullibole  LLD (29 November 1811 – 27 April 1895) was a Scottish lawyer and politician.

Life
Moncreiff was born on 29 November 1811 to Ann, daughter of George Robertson, R. N. and Sir James Wellwood Moncreiff, 9th Baronet, a Scottish judge. He was born at his parents' Edinburgh townhouse on 13 Northumberland Street.

He was educated at Edinburgh High School then studied law at the University of Edinburgh and was admitted to the Faculty of Advocates in 1833. He was appointed Solicitor General for Scotland in 1850, and Lord Advocate from 1851 to 1852, from 1852 to 1858, from 1859 to 1866 and from 1868 to 1869. He was Dean of the Faculty of Advocates from 1858 to 1869. He was appointed Lord Justice Clerk from 1869 to 1888.

Moncreiff was appointed a Privy Counsellor in 1869. He was Rector of the University of Glasgow from 1868 to 1871, and held the degrees of LLD from both Edinburgh and Glasgow universities.

Moncreiff was Member of Parliament for Leith Burghs from 1851 to 1859, for Edinburgh from 1859 to 1868 and for Glasgow and Aberdeen Universities in 1868. During a long career in parliament Moncreiff guided the passing of over 100 acts of parliament, and his name is associated with the reform of legal procedure and mercantile law. As lord advocate he was engaged as public prosecutor in important cases, notably the trials of Madeline Smith, Wielobycki, and the directors of the Western bank. In 1856, he defended the Scotsman in the libel action raised by Duncan McLaren, one of the members for the city of Edinburgh.

In January 1857, Moncreiff was presented with the freedom of his native city for the part he took in regard to the Municipal Extension Act. In 1859 he was appointed Lieutenant-Colonel Commandant of the newly formed 1st Queen's Edinburgh Rifle Volunteer Brigade (No 1 Company of which was recruited from Edinburgh advocates) – the first rifle volunteer corps in Scotland. He held the appointment until 1873 when he was appointed Honorary Colonel. In 1860, he helped pass the annuity tax bill, a subject in which, as a free churchman, he took close interest, and in the following year he carried the major bill relating to burgh and parochial schools. In 1861 he was engaged as leading counsel in the defence of Sir William Johnston, one of the directors of the Edinburgh and Glasgow bank, and in 1863-4 he was counsel in the famous Yelverton case.

For 19 years Lord Moncreiff occupied the judicial bench, presiding over the trials in the justiciary court of Chantrelle (1878), the City of Glasgow Bank directors (1878), the dynamitards (1883), and the crofters (1886).

Extrajudicially Moncreiff was occupied in many other matters. As a lecturer he was in great request, and delivered numerous orations in Edinburgh and Glasgow on subjects of literary, scientific, and political interest to the Philosophical Institution, Royal Society, Juridical Society, Scots Law Society, and other bodies. Moncreiff also published anonymously in 1871 a novel entitled A Visit to my Discontented Cousin, which was reprinted, with additions, from Fraser's Magazine. He was also a frequent contributor to the Edinburgh Review.

In 1858 Moncreiff received the honorary degree of LL.D. from the University of Edinburgh. From 1868 to 1871 he was rector of the University of Glasgow from which he received a second honorary doctorate of LL.D. in 1879, and in 1869 he was appointed a member of the Privy Council. On 23 May 1871 he was created a baronet of Kilduff in the County of Kinross in the Baronetage of the United Kingdom. On 9 January 1874 he was created Baron Moncreiff, of Tulliebole in the County of Kinross in the Peerage of the United Kingdom; in 1878 he was appointed a royal commissioner under the Endowed Institutions (Scotland) Act, and in 1883 he succeeded his brother as 11th baronet of Moncreiff.

In 1870 he was elected a Fellow of the Royal Society of Edinburgh his proposer was Charles Neaves. He was President of the Society 1879 to 1884.

In 1875, he became the inaugural President of the conservationist group the Cockburn Association, a position he held until 1893.

In September 1888, Moncreiff resigned the position of Lord Justice Clerk, and took up the preparation of his Memorials. On these he was engaged till his death on 27 April 1895.

Family
On 12 September 1834 Moncreiff married Isabella Bell (d.1881), only daughter of Robert Bell FRSE (1781–1861), procurator of the Church of Scotland, and Sheriff of Berwickshire and Haddingtonshire. They lived at 47 Moray Place in the west end of Edinburgh.

They had two daughters and five sons. Their eldest son Henry Moncreiff, 2nd Baron Moncreiff sat from 1888 under the title of Lord Wellwood, as a Lord of Session.

References

Attribution

External links 
 
Portrait and family details 

1811 births
1895 deaths
Barons in the Peerage of the United Kingdom
Lord Advocates
Deans of the Faculty of Advocates
Members of the Privy Council of the United Kingdom
Scottish Liberal Party MPs
Presidents of the Royal Society of Edinburgh
Alumni of the University of Edinburgh
Rectors of the University of Edinburgh
Solicitors General for Scotland
UK MPs 1847–1852
UK MPs 1852–1857
UK MPs 1857–1859
UK MPs 1859–1865
UK MPs 1865–1868
UK MPs 1868–1874
UK MPs who were granted peerages
Members of the Parliament of the United Kingdom for Glasgow and Aberdeen Universities
Moncreiff
Members of the Parliament of the United Kingdom for Edinburgh constituencies
Peers of the United Kingdom created by Queen Victoria